Caladenia ampla, commonly known as the dainty spider orchid, is a plant in the orchid family Orchidaceae and is endemic to Victoria. It is a ground orchid with a single hairy leaf and a single flower which is sometimes yellowish-green flower with red stripes and sometimes entirely red.

Description

The labellum is cream-coloured with red veins and a dark red tip, sometimes entirely red. There are 9 to 12 pairs of calli along the edge of the labellum, decreasing in length towards its front. There are four rows of foot-shaped calli in the centre of the labellum, also smaller towards the tip. Flowering occurs in September and October.

Taxonomy and naming
The species was first formally described by David L. Jones in 2006 and given the name Arachnorchis ampla. The description was published in Australian Orchid Research. In 2007, Gary Backhouse changed the name to Caladenia ampla and the change was published in "The Victorian Naturalist". The specific epithet (ampla) is a Latin word meaning "large", referring to the unusually broad labellum of this orchid.

Distribution and habitat
Caladenia ampla is only known from the goldfields region of Victoria where it grows in mallee scrub and woodlands.

Conservation
This species is classified as "Endangered"  by the Victorian government.

References

ampla
Plants described in 1994
Endemic orchids of Australia
Orchids of Victoria (Australia)
Taxa named by David L. Jones (botanist)